João Afonso Telo,  (died on 14 August 1385 in the Battle of Aljubarrota), mayor of Lisbon in 1372, admiral of Portugal from 13751376, and sixth Count of Barcelos,  was a member of the highest ranks of the nobility, member of the Téllez de Meneses lineage as a descendant of Tello Pérez de Meneses.

Family relations
He was the son of Martim Afonso Telo de Meneses — mayordomo mayor of Maria of Portugal, queen consort as the wife of King Alfonso XI of Castile — who was killed in 1356 following the orders of King Peter of Castile. His mother was Aldonça Anes de Vasconcelos,  daughter of João Mendes de Vasconcelos, Alcalde of Estremoz, and Aldara Alfonso Alcoforado. He had one brother, Gonçalo Teles de Meneses, Count of Neiva and Lord of Faria, and two sisters, Maria Teles, murdered by her second husband, John, and Leonor Teles, queen consort by her marriage with King Ferdinand I of Portugal. He also had a half-sister, Joana Teles de Meneses, the wife of Juan Alfonso Pimentel, Count of Benavente.

Life
 During the third Fernandine War João Afonso Telo commanded the Portuguese fleet in the Battle of Saltes Island fought between the Crown of Castille, under the command of Fernando Sánchez de Tovar, and the Kingdom of Portugal. The result of the battle was the destruction of the naval offensive capability of Portugal, achieving the Castilian naval supremacy in the Atlantic Ocean. Portuguese chronicler, Fernão Lopes in his Chronica de el-rei D. Fernando  blamed the defeat on the arrogance and haughtiness of the Count of Barcelos.

He participated in the assassination of Count Juan Fernández de Andeiro, alleged lover of Queen Leonor, and was present on 6 December 1383 when the master of the Order of Aviz, the future John I of Portugal, entered the queen's chambers to kill Fernández Andeiro. He switched loyalties later and supported the Castilian King, Juan I who made him Count of Mayorga, as the pretender to the Portuguese throne.

He married Beatriz Alfonso de Alburquerque, an illegitimate daughter of João Afonso de Albuquerque, the tutor and chancellor of King Peter of Castile, and of his mistress María Rodríguez Barba. One of his wife's sister married to João Afonso's brother, Gonçalo Teles.  Even though he had issue with Beatriz, he had no grandchildren.

João Afonso died in Aljubarrota and was the only enemy killed in this battle who was buried by order of the Portuguese king.

See also
 Battle of Saltes Island
 Fernandine Wars

References

Bibliography 

 
 
 
 
 

14th-century births
1385 deaths
Portuguese military personnel
Portuguese admirals
14th-century Portuguese people
People of the 1383–1385 Portuguese interregnum
Medieval admirals